The LiquidGolf.com Invitational was a golf tournament on the Champions Tour from 1996 to 2000. It was played in Sarasota, Florida at the TPC at Prestancia.

The purse for the 2000 tournament was US$1,200,000, with $180,000 going to the winner. The tournament was founded in 1996 as the American Express Invitational.

Winners
LiquidGolf.com Invitational
2000 Tom Wargo

American Express Invitational
1999 Bruce Fleisher
1998 Larry Nelson
1997 Buddy Allin
1996 Hale Irwin

Source:

References

Former PGA Tour Champions events
Golf in Florida
Recurring sporting events established in 1996
Recurring sporting events disestablished in 2000
1996 establishments in Florida
2000 disestablishments in Florida